Jeannot Moes (born 11 May 1948) is a retired Luxembourg footballer.

International career
He is a member of the Luxembourg national football team from 1970 to 1983.

External links

1948 births
Living people
Luxembourgian footballers
Luxembourg international footballers
Association football goalkeepers
FC Avenir Beggen players